The European Federation of Biotechnology (EFB) was established by European scientists in 1978. It is a non-profit federation of national biotechnology associations, learned societies, universities, scientific institutes, biotechnology companies and individual biotechnologists working to promote biotechnology throughout Europe and beyond.

The mission of the EFB is to promote the safe, sustainable and beneficial use of the life sciences, to promote research and innovation at the cutting edge of biotechnology, to provide a forum for interdisciplinary and international cooperation, to improve scientific education and to facilitate an informed dialogue between scientists, the biotechnology industries and the public.

The EFB currently has around 25,000 personal members, who span the world from Latin America to China, Korea and Japan. The EFB has 7 Divisions that focus on the key biotechnology fields:

 Biobased Materials Division
 Biocatalysis Division
 Bioengineering and Bioprocessing Division
 Biopharmaceutical Division
 Environmental Biotechnology Division
 Microbial Biotechnology Division
 Plant, Agriculture and Food Division.

The EFB Central Office (ECO) is located in Barcelona, Spain. Membership administration, organization of Executive Board meetings and General Assemblies, website management and organization of scientific meetings for EFB Divisions and promotion of the European Congresses on Biotechnology are some of the main responsibilities of ECO.

European Congress on Biotechnology

The European Congress on Biotechnology (ECB) is a conference for academic and industrial biotechnologists in Europe, organised by the European Federation of Biotechnology.

The first Congress in the series was held in 1978 (Interlaken, Switzerland).  The event is organised every second year. Due to the covid-19 pandemic, the Congress planned for 2020 had to be postponed to 2024. It will be held in Maastricht, the Netherlands. “Biotechnology for the Grand Challenges of our Society” will be the theme of the event.

Other events 
Apart from the ECB, the EFB, together with its Divisions, organises also regular specialised biotechnology events, like:

 Applied Synthetic Biology in Europe (ASBE)
 Recombinant Protein Production (RPP)
 Green for Good (G4G) series 
 Microbial Stress
 Conference on Physiology of Yeasts and Filamentous Fungi (PYFF).

Journals
EFB Bioeconomy Journal is an official journal of the European Federation of Biotechnology (EFB). It covers the science, natural and social sciences, the technologies and the humanities related to bioeconomy and its surrounding political, business, ethics, regulatory, social, and financial milieu. The journal publishes high quality peer-reviewed original research papers, authoritative reviews, feature articles and opinions in all areas of bioeconomy. It reflects the wide diversity of bioeconomy facets, particularly those advances in research and technologies, such as biotechnologies and others that open opportunities for exploitation of knowledge, commercially or otherwise, together with news, discussion, and comment on broader issues of general interest and concern. The outlook is fully international.

New Biotechnology is the official journal of the European Federation of Biotechnology (EFB) and is published bimonthly. It covers both the science of biotechnology and its surrounding political, business and financial milieu. The journal publishes peer-reviewed basic research papers, authoritative reviews, feature articles and opinions in all areas of biotechnology. It reflects the full diversity of current biotechnology science, particularly those advances in research and practice that open opportunities for exploitation of knowledge, commercially or otherwise, together with news, discussion and comment on broader issues of general interest and concern. The outlook is fully international.

See also
 Directorate-General for Research
 EuCheMS
 EuropaBio
 European Federation of Pharmaceutical Industries and Associations (EFPIA)
 FlandersBio

References

External links
 
 European Congress on Biotechnology
 EFB Bioeconomy Journal
 New Biotechnology
 Executive Board

Biotechnology organizations
Biotechnology advocacy
European medical and health organizations
Pan-European trade and professional organizations
1978 establishments in Europe
Organizations established in 1978